Saint-Astier may refer to the following places in France:

 Saint-Astier, Dordogne, a commune in the Dordogne department
 Saint-Astier, Lot-et-Garonne, a commune in the Lot-et-Garonne department